The Jim McKay Turf Sprint is a Listed American Thoroughbred horse race for three-year-olds and up over a distance of five furlongs on the turf held  as part of the undercard for the Black-Eyed Susan Stakes annually during the third week of May at Pimlico Race Course in Baltimore, Maryland.   The race offers a purse of $100,000.

The Jim McKay Turf Sprint is the lead off leg of the Mid Atlantic Thoroughbred Championships Sprint Turf Division or MATCh Races.  MATCh is a series of five races in five separate thoroughbred divisions run throughout four Mid-Atlantic States including; Pimlico Race Course and Laurel Park Racecourse in Maryland; Delaware Park Racetrack in Delaware; Parx, Philadelphia Park and Presque Isle Downs in Pennsylvania and Monmouth Park in New Jersey.

Race name 

The race was named in honor of James Kenneth McManus (1921-2008), better known by his professional name of Jim McKay, was an American television sports journalist. McKay is best known for hosting ABC's Wide World of Sports (1961–1998). McKay covered a wide variety of special events, including horse races such as the Kentucky Derby, the Preakness Stakes, golf events such as the British Open, and the Indianapolis 500.

History
The Jim McKay Turf Sprint was first run in 2006 as the Baltimore Breeders' Cup Turf Sprint. In 2007, it ran as the Baltimore City Turf Sprint and in 2008 the race was known as the Old Mutual Turf Sprint. The stakes record is held by Heros Reward, who won the race in 2007 in a time of :55.90 over five furlongs.

Records 
 
Speed record: 
 5 furlongs - 55 4/5 - Hero's Reward  (2007)
 
Most wins by a horse:
 5 - Ben's Cat (2011, 2013, 2014, 2015 & 2016)

Most wins by a jockey:
 3 - Julian Pimentel (2013, 2014 & 2015)

Most wins by a trainer:
 5 - King T. Leatherbury  (2011, 2013, 2014, 2015 & 2016)

Most wins by an owner:
 5 - The Jim Stable    (2011, 2013, 2014, 2015 & 2016)

Winners of the Jim McKay Turf Sprint since 2006

See also 

 Jim McKay Turf Sprint top three finishers
 Pimlico Race Course
 List of graded stakes at Pimlico Race Course

References 

2006 establishments in Maryland
Pimlico Race Course
Horse races in Maryland
Recurring sporting events established in 2006